Brockenhurst railway station serves the village of Brockenhurst in Hampshire, England. It is located on the South West Main Line from London Waterloo to Weymouth. It is also the junction of the Lymington Branch Line with the main line. It is  down the line from Waterloo.
It is managed and served by South Western Railway and it is also served by CrossCountry trains.

The station was winner of the 2009 National Rail Award for best medium-sized station, with the judges stating they "were impressed by the standard of customer service, station presentation, initiative and innovation they observed, all of which ensure that the station provides a smooth, efficient and pleasant departure and arrival point for the travelling customer". The station was also winner of a National Cycling Award, for a system which informs passengers of where cycle spaces are on approaching trains, allowing them to speed boarding, and partnerships with local bike-hire firms.

History
Brockenhurst station was opened on 1 June 1847 as part of the Southampton and Dorchester Railway (nicknamed the Castleman's Corkscrew) with services running to Southampton in one direction and Dorchester via Ringwood and Wimborne Minster the other. The following year, the railway was amalgamated with the London and South Western Railway. On 12 July 1858 the Lymington Branch Line opened, beginning shuttle services between the station and Lymington, turning the station into a junction station and leading to its name being changed between 1876 and 1888 to Brockenhurst Junction to emphasise this.

On 5 March 1888 the direct line from Brockenhurst via Sway to Bournemouth and Poole and bypassing the longer 'Corkscrew', opened to traffic. This massively increased the number of trains passing through the station for both routes and enhancing its status as an interchange, especially after the downgrading of the 'corkscrew' in 1893 to that of a branch line. Brockenhurst station, along with the L&SWR was taken over by Southern Railway in 1923 and under their ownership, the station was extended in 1936 to include two new platforms.  Services over the old Southampton and Dorchester line via Ringwood fell victim to the Beeching Axe, ceasing in May 1964. The track through the station was electrified in 1967 and the station saw minor changes as part of British Rail's Network SouthEast region.

In 2014 the station received £4.6 million of government grants as part of the Access for All initiative to replace the footbridge at Brockenhurst with a new bridge complete with lift shafts. Step-free access to platforms 1 and 2 was previously by a rotating turntable bridge across the tracks while step-free access to platforms 3 and 4 was across the track bed itself.

Station layout
The station consists of four platforms, arranged in two island platforms, with a ticket office housed in the main building nearest Platform 1 on the side closest to the village. The platforms, ticket office and car park are all connected by footbridge, with the ticket office at one end and the car park and bicycle hire point at the other end of the walkway.

Platform 1 - Up loop platform used by stopping services from Poole where it is overtaken by the express services from Weymouth and CrossCountry services from Bournemouth on platform 2. This platform is occasionally used by Lymington services, which is normally the first service in the morning. A weekday evening service to Portsmouth and Southsea via Southampton Central used to run from this platform but, since the COVID-19 pandemic, this has since ceased
Platform 2 - for through services towards Southampton, Winchester and London Waterloo.
Platform 3 - for through services towards Bournemouth, Poole and Weymouth.
Platform 4 - Down loop platform for Lymington services, this can also be used by other down services, but this is rare.

A signal box and level crossing is located at the northern end of the station.

Services

Rail
The station is primarily served by South Western Railway, In addition, CrossCountry operate some services from Bournemouth to Manchester Piccadilly via  and Birmingham New Street.

Most CrossCountry services by-pass the station without stopping.

As of February 2022, the services calling at this station include:
 Monday - Friday:
 1 train per hour on Weymouth - Waterloo semi-fast service
 During peak hours, some of the Weymouth service run fast non-stop through this station, with a portion split at Southampton Central serving this stop
 1 train per hour on Poole - Waterloo fast service
 1 train per hour on Bournemouth - Winchester stopping service
 During peak hours, stopping services run through to Waterloo, with some joining to / splitting from a portion with Weymouth - Waterloo fast service. 
 2 trains per hour on Brockenhurst - Lymington Pier service
 1-2 trains per day on Bournemouth - Manchester CrossCountry service
 Saturday:
 2 trains per hour on Weymouth - Waterloo services, 1 fast and 1 semi-fast
 1 train per hour on Poole - Winchester stopping service
 2 trains per hour on Brockenhurst - Lymington Pier service
 1-2 trains per day on Bournemouth - Manchester CrossCountry service
 Sunday:
 1 train per hour on Weymouth - Waterloo fast service
 1 train per hour on Poole - Waterloo stopping service
 2 trains per hour on Brockenhurst - Lymington Pier service
 2 trains per day on Bournemouth - Manchester CrossCountry service

Bus
Local bus routes serve the bus stop located outside the ticket hall. There is a year-round Bluestar 6 service to Lymington in the south, Lyndhurst to the north and onward connections to Totton and Southampton. In the summer time, this is supplemented by the seasonal New Forest Tour green and blue routes to Lymington, Beaulieu, Hythe and Lyndhurst and Burley, New Milton, Barton on Sea, Milford on Sea and Lymington.

Gallery of historic pictures

References

External links 

 Brockenhurst station at South Western Railway
 Brockenhurst station at National Rail Enquiries

Railway stations in Hampshire
DfT Category C2 stations
Former London and South Western Railway stations
Railway stations in Great Britain opened in 1847
Railway stations served by CrossCountry
Railway stations served by South Western Railway
New Forest
1847 establishments in England